Frellstedt is a railway station located in Frellstedt, Germany. The station is located on the Brunswick–Magdeburg railway. The train services are operated by Deutsche Bahn.

Train services
The following services currently call at the station:

Local services  Braunschweig - Helmstedt - Magdeburg - Burg

References

Railway stations in Lower Saxony